BC Krasny Oktyabr was a Russian professional basketball club that is based in Volgograd. In English, the club's name translates to "'BC Red October'". The club played in the VTB United League until 2016, when the team was forced to leave the league because its home arena did not meet requirements.

History
The team was founded in 2012, and played its first season in the Russian Basketball Super League, the second division in Russia. In the 2013–14 season, the team played in the VTB United League, the highest stage for Russian clubs. In the first season of Krasny Oktyabr in the VTB United League, it qualified for the playoffs by finishing in the 6th place in Group B. Also, European powerhouse CSKA Moscow was defeated by Krasny Oktyabr in the quarterfinals of the 2013–14 Russian Cup tournament.

On August 30, 2016, the team was forced to leave the United League, because its home arena wasn't approved to host tournaments.

Arenas
The club usually played its home games at the 3,700 seat Volgograd Sports Palace of Trade Unions, which is located in Volgograd. The club also played European-wide competition home games at the 5,000 seat Krylatskoye Sports Palace, which is located in Moscow.

Season by season

Notable players

  D. J. Cooper

References

External links
Official site  
Eurobasket team profile

Defunct basketball teams in Russia
Sport in Volgograd
Basketball teams established in 2012
2012 establishments in Russia
Basketball teams disestablished in 2016
2016 disestablishments in Russia